Mydans is a surname. Notable people with the surname include:

Carl Mydans (1907–2004), American photographer 
Shelley Smith Mydans (1915–2002), American novelist, journalist, and prisoner of war, wife of Carl

See also
 Mydan